Coptostomabarbus is a small genus of cyprinid fish containing only two African species.

Species
 Coptostomabarbus bellcrossi Poll, 1969
 Coptostomabarbus wittei L. R. David & Poll, 1937 (Upjaw barb)

References

 

Cyprinidae genera
Cyprinid fish of Africa